Enrico Platé (28 January 1909, Milan, Italy – 2 February 1954, Buenos Aires, Argentina) was a motor racing driver and team manager. Although born in Italy, Platé raced, and latterly ran his racing team Scuderia Enrico Platé, under Swiss nationality. He began his career as a mechanic, but swiftly took to racing cars in addition to repairing them. His best result as a driver was fourth place (albeit also last place) in the 1938 Modena Autodrome. Although he did not achieve any notable success in the pre-World War II voiturette class, Enrico Platé became a significant and influential figure in post-war grand prix and early Formula One racing as a team owner. During his brief career in this role, Platé ran Maseratis for notable drivers such as Prince Bira, Harry Schell and fellow Swiss Toulo de Graffenried.

Team owner
Although he did not fully withdraw from driving until 1948, Enrico Platé tasted success as a team owner as early as 1946, when he provided the car that took racing legend Tazio Nuvolari to his final grand prix victory, in the Albi Grand Prix. In 1947 Christian Kautz won the prestigious Grand Prix de la Marne at Reims-Gueux in a Platé-entered Maserati 4CL, and the following year Nello Pagani drove the same car to victory in the Pau Grand Prix. Sadly for Scuderia Enrico Platé, the team also tasted tragedy in 1948 when Kautz was killed while driving one of their 4CLs in his home Grand Prix at Bremgarten. In 1949 de Graffenried scored Platé's final major race win with victory in the British Grand Prix, this time in Platé's new Maserati 4CLT/48. Bira took the lesser Swedish Summer Grand Prix later that season.

With the dominance of first the works Alfa Romeo and then Ferrari teams, Platé's cars were never front-runners in the early years of the Formula One World Championship. However, minor and non-Championship Grands Prix events saw Scuderia Enrico Platé take a further five race victories between 1950 and 1953. The revisions and alterations were sufficiently significant for Maserati to allow Scuderia Platé to enter the car as the Maserati-Platé, making Platé the only Formula One engine manufacturer to originate in Switzerland.1

In the early part of 1953 Platé began to run into financial difficulty. Although he maintained a presence at races, this was usually by preparing cars for de Graffenried rather than as an entrant himself. Enrico Platé met a premature end when he was killed in an accident during a brief return to the track, driving in a minor Formula Libre race in Buenos Aires in 1954.

Complete Formula One World Championship results
(key) (Results in bold indicate pole position; results in italics indicate fastest lap; † indicates shared drive.) 

† Indicates shared drive

Footnotes
1 Discounting Sauber's rebranded, British-built engines used during the 1993 Formula One season.

References

External links
Baron de Graffenried at the wheel of the short-wheelbase Maserati-Platé F2 car.

1909 births
1954 deaths
Swiss motorsport people
Swiss racing drivers
Grand Prix drivers
Formula One entrants
Formula One team owners
Formula One team principals
Racing drivers who died while racing
Swiss auto racing teams
Sport deaths in Argentina
Italian motorsport people